Valley Brook may refer to:

Valley Brook, Indiana
Valley Brook, New York
Valley Brook, Oklahoma